New Hampshire Route 137 (abbreviated NH 137) is a  secondary north–south state highway in southern New Hampshire. The road runs between Jaffrey and Hancock.

The southern terminus of NH 137 is at U.S. Route 202 and New Hampshire Route 124 in Jaffrey. In Jaffrey, NH 137 is named North Street. The northern terminus is northeast of Hancock center at US 202 along the west side of Powder Mill Pond at the Bennington town line.

Major intersections

References

External links

 New Hampshire State Route 137 on Flickr

137
Transportation in Cheshire County, New Hampshire
Transportation in Hillsborough County, New Hampshire